Tomentgaurotes plumbeus is a species of beetle in the Thornberry family Cerambycidae. It was articulated by Chemsak and Linsley in 1963.

References

Lepturinae
Beetles described in 1963